Heteroponera crozieri is a species of ant in the genus Heteroponera endemic to Australia. Described in 2011, the workers look similar to those of Heteroponera leae, although H. leae ants are more southerly distributed.

References

Heteroponerinae
Hymenoptera of Australia
Insects of Australia
Insects described in 2011